Shri Ram Centre for Performing Arts or SRC one of Delhi's best known theatres at Mandi House on Safdar Hasmi Marg, New Delhi, close to the Kendra, it is run by the Indian National Theatre Trust established in 1958 the promotion of Art and Culture,  with people like Sheila Bharat Ram, Kamla Devi Chattopadhyay, Nandita Kriplani and Aditya Srivastava associated with it. The Centre runs a certified Two Year Acting  Course. The SRCPA Theatre Repertory Company started in 1980 and Puppet Theatre company, which over the years saw the rise of modern puppetry under puppeteer Dadi Padamjee.

History 

The present building of the Centre opened in the early ’60s. It was designed by Shiv Nath Prasad with help from theatre doyen, Ebrahim Alkazi, and was constructed under the overall supervision of industrialist Vinay Bharat Ram of Shriram Group (DCM Ltd.), from the industrialist family of Lala Shri Ram. The Shankar Lal Murli Dhar Auditorium has a capacity of 375 people at two levels; 300 in the stall & 75 in the balcony.

Repertory 

The SRCPA Repertory was set up in 1980. Presently, the Repertory is a full-time professional resident theatre company, performing regularly in Delhi and in other parts of the country. The company comprises 14 artists and a resident director namely, Sameep Singh (Chief of Repertory)

Over the years, the SRC Repertory Company has been working with directors like Rajinder Nath, Ranjit Kapoor, B.V. Karanth, Habib Tanveer, B.M. Shah, Bansi Kaul, Piyush Mishra, Suresh Sharma, Roysten Abel, Sanjay Upadhyay, Bapi Bose, Avtaar Sahni, Chittaranjan Tripathi, Urmil Kumar Thapliyal, Mushtaq Kak, Chetan Dattar, Rabijita Gogoi, Aniruddh Khutwad, K. Madvane, K.S. Rajendran, Zafar Sanjari, Sameep Singh, Sohaila Kapur and Niloy Roy.

Notable alumni 
Notable alumni include:
Mukesh Chhabra
Narendra Jha
Rajkumar Rao 
Jatin Sarna

See also
 Shri Ram Centre for Performing Arts

References 

Theatres in India
Culture of Delhi
Drama schools in India
Theatrical organisations in India
Performing arts centres
Performing arts in India
Performing arts venues in India